Below is the timeline of maritime events during the Emergency, (as World War II was known in Ireland). This period was referred to as The Long Watch by Irish Mariners.  This list is of events which affected the Irish Mercantile Marine, other ships carrying Irish exports or imports, and events near the Irish coast.

Timeline
In this list, the nationality of non-Irish ships is given, the phrase "British-flagged" is used for ships which transferred from the Irish registry.

1939

1940

1941

1942

1943

1944

1945

See also
 Irish Mercantile Marine during World War II main article
 Irish neutrality during World War II – international relations
 MV Kerlogue – the exemplar of neutral Irish ships during World War Two.
 The Emergency (Ireland) – internal, national issues during World War II
 Timeline of the Second Battle of the Atlantic

Notes

Bibliography
 
 
 
 
 
 
 
 
 
 
 
 
 (Later republished as:)

References

External links
 Commemorative Brochure (Maritime Institute of Ireland)
 Irish Seamens' Relatives Association
 Commemoration, includes two videos
 Irish Mercantile Marine Deaths 1940–1945

Maritime history of Ireland
Independent Ireland in World War II
Ireland-related lists
Battle of the Atlantic
Chronology of World War II
Military history of the Republic of Ireland